Sten Svantesson Bielke, also Steno Bielke, (1598 – 2 April 1638) was a statesman of the Swedish Empire.

Bielke studied in Uppsala and Tübingen before he became chamberlain of Gustavus Adolphus of Sweden in 1619. Together with Bengt Bengtson Oxenstierna, he traveled to Jerusalem and other sites in the Holy Land in 1613, 1619 and 1623. From 1627 to 1629, he attended the University of Leiden.

In 1630, he was Swedish commander in Stralsund. In 1631, he was appointed Swedish legate in occupied Pomerania, succeeding Carl Banér. He occupied this position until his death. In 1633, Bielke became a member of the rigsråd. In 1636, he was appointed general legate in Germany. He died on 2 April 1638 in Stettin (now Szczecin).

See also
 Treaty of Stettin (1630)

References

Bibliography
 
 
 
 
 

1598 births
1638 deaths
Members of the Privy Council of Sweden
Swedish Pomerania
Swedish people of the Thirty Years' War
Swedish diplomats
17th-century Swedish politicians